Georges Henrion (born 8 October 1894, date of death unknown) was a Belgian athlete. He competed in the men's high jump at the 1920 Summer Olympics.

References

1894 births
Year of death missing
Athletes (track and field) at the 1920 Summer Olympics
Belgian male high jumpers
Olympic athletes of Belgium
Place of birth missing